In survey sampling, respondent error refers to any error introduced into the survey results due to respondents providing untrue or incorrect information.  It is a type of systemic bias.

Several factors can lead to respondent error.  Language and educational issues can lead to a misunderstanding of the question by the respondent, or similarly, a misunderstanding of the response by the surveyor.  Recall bias can lead to misinformation based on a respondent misrecalling the facts in question.  Social desirability bias can lead a respondent to respond in a fashion that he or she thinks is correct or better or less embarrassing, rather than providing true and honest responses.

When designing a survey it should be remembered that uppermost in the respondent's mind will be protecting their own personal privacy, integrity and interests. Also, the way the respondent interprets the questionnaire and the wording of the answer the respondent gives can cause inaccuracies to enter the survey data. Careful questionnaire design, effective training of interviewers and adequate survey testing can overcome these problems to some extent.

Sometimes, it also may be a case that a particular survey is being done for a socially prohibited issue, like use of pantyhose as conducted by DuPont in 2001–02. For such surveys questionnaire may not be as successful as a Projective Technique. So, some cases can be classified where the respondents may intentionally generate an error.

Survey methodology